Oreini may refer to:

 Oreini, Ilia, or Mostenitsa, a village in southern Greece
 Oreini, Serres, a community in northern Greece